Sarvakalasala is a 1987 Indian Malayalam-language romantic comedy film written and directed by Venu Nagavally from a story by Cheriyan Kalpakavadi. The film stars Mohanlal, Jagathy Sreekumar, Sukumaran, Adoor Bhasi, and Seema. The music for the film was composed by M. G. Radhakrishnan.

Plot
It tells the story of an orphan college student Lal, who is taking his 3rd master's degree from a college and continues as a student in the same college to avoid being lonely. He lives in a home nearby college and lives from the leftover money obtained legally when he was a child. He is an affable person to all in the college. There are people who are teachers now, who were his classmates. His word as elder brother is taken as a final statement among students. Chakkara and his cohorts are the all-rounders team in college activities.

Jeevan is an orphanage friend of Lal's whom he meets among the new batch of students. Lal takes Jeevan and his sister Jyothimol as his family. Siddhan is a bohemian poet who is an alcoholic and friend of Lal who lives with him. Principal Achen, Charachira Achan and Kuttanad Achen hold the main roles in the college. One day Siddhan leaves Lal and goes for journeying, later news is received he was murdered. Jeevan, who is in a mentally weakened state asks Lal to admit him to a psychiatric hospital and look after his sister for a while.

Meanwhile, Lal gets reacquainted with his old college flame Gayathri, who has now joined as an English teacher at the College. The College Annual Arts festival nears and everyone is readying for the function. Lal, for the mental well-being of Jyothimol promotes her interest in dancing for the Annual Arts festival. After the dance, Lal packs her bag and waits outside. Suddenly, the electricity goes off and someone sexually assaults Jyothimol, she cries out. The first to come at scene is Lal and everyone suspects Lal.

The management charges a case against Lal. Lal is arrested by the police. Before presenting him to the Police, the real culprit is found by the students. The management staff along with the majority of the students come for the release of Lal. When Lal sees Jyothimol and Jeevan, he becomes relieved and they hug each other. Principal Achen speaks of the goodness inside a student who comes to college is like "standing under the golden canopy of thine evening sky and they lift their eager eyes to knowledge and values. Goodness always wins."

Cast

Mohanlal as Lal / Lalettan
Nedumudi Venu as Siddhan Aashan
Adoor Bhasi as College Principal
Jagathi Sreekumar as Fr. Kuttanad
Sankaradi as Charachira Achan
Sukumaran as Jayadevan/Kurup
Seema as Sharadamani
Sreenath as Jeevan
Lizy as Jyothimol
K. B. Ganesh Kumar as Panchara
Manian Pillai Raju as Chakkara
Jalaja as Sister Alphonsa
Sukumari as Leelama
Innocent Vincent as Innachan
Sandhya Rani as Gayathri
Nandhu as Jose Abraham
T. P. Madhavan as Psychiatrist
Jagadeesh as Najeeb

Soundtrack
The music was composed by M. G. Radhakrishnan and the lyrics were written by Kavalam Narayana Panicker. It was distributed by Tharangini Records.

References

External links
 
 

1980s Malayalam-language films
1987 films
1987 romantic drama films
Films directed by Venu Nagavally
Films scored by M. G. Radhakrishnan
Indian romantic drama films